Raphimetopus ablutella, the green borer, is a species of snout moth in the genus Raphimetopus. It was described by Philipp Christoph Zeller in 1894. It is found in Spain, Portugal, France, Italy, Romania, Bulgaria, North Macedonia, Greece, Israel, Saudi Arabia, Sudan, the United Arab Emirates, Yemen, India and South Africa.

The larvae have been recorded on Zea mays and Saccharum officinarum. They bore the shoots of their host plant.

References

Moths described in 1839
Anerastiini
Insects of the Arabian Peninsula
Moths of Europe
Insects of Turkey